"Marco Polo" is the 60th episode of the HBO original series The Sopranos and the eighth of the show's fifth season. Written by Michael Imperioli and directed by John Patterson, it originally aired on April 25, 2004.

Starring
 James Gandolfini as Tony Soprano
 Lorraine Bracco as Dr. Jennifer Melfi *
 Edie Falco as Carmela Soprano
 Michael Imperioli as Christopher Moltisanti
 Dominic Chianese as Corrado Soprano, Jr. 
 Steven Van Zandt as Silvio Dante *
 Tony Sirico as Paulie Gualtieri *
 Robert Iler as Anthony Soprano, Jr. 
 Jamie-Lynn DiScala as Meadow Soprano
 Drea de Matteo as Adriana La Cerva
 Aida Turturro as Janice Soprano Baccalieri *
 Steven R. Schirripa as Bobby Baccalieri
 Vincent Curatola as Johnny Sack
 John Ventimiglia as Artie Bucco
 Kathrine Narducci as Charmaine Bucco
 Steve Buscemi as Tony Blundetto

* = credit only

Guest starring

 Ray Abruzzo as Little Carmine
 Tom Aldredge as Hugh De Angelis
 Allison Bartlett as Gwen McIntyre
 Chris Caldovino as Billy Leotardo
 Toni Kalem as Angie Bonpensiero
 Joe Maruzzo as "Joey Peeps"
 Joe Santos as Angelo Garepe
 Paul Schulze as Father Phil Intintola
 Suzanne Shepherd as Mary De Angelis
 Frank Vincent as Phil Leotardo
 Frankie Valli as Rusty Millio
 Sharon Angela as Rosalie Aprile
 Will Janowitz as Finn DeTrolio
 Bruce Kirby as Dr. Russ Fegoli
 Matthew Del Negro as Brian Cammarata
 Marianne Leone as Joanne Moltisanti
 Dennis Aloia as Justin Blundetto
 Kevin Aloia as Jason Blundetto
 Rae Allen as Quintina Blundetto
 Jessica Dunphy as Devin Pillsbury
 Garry Pastore as Jerry Basile
 Barbara Caruso as Lena Fegoli
 Samrat Chakrabarti as Dr. Onkar Singh
 Allison Dunbar as Nicole Lupertazzi
 Louis Mustillo as Sal Vitro
 Tony Siragusa as Frankie Cortese
 Erin Stutland as Heather
 Philip Larocca as Edward "Duke" Bonpensiero
 Sammy Semenza as Carmine III
 Vic Martino as Muzzy Nardo

Synopsis

After the recent car chase, Tony meets with Johnny and agrees to pay for the damage to Phil's car. To control costs, he has the work done in the late Pussy's body shop, now run by his widow Angie. When the work is finished, Phil demands further repairs for non-existent defects.

Tensions rise in New York. Little Carmine's yacht is holed and sinks. His crew attempt to recruit Tony B through Angelo, his old prison buddy. Angelo and Rusty offer him "a chance to earn": in retaliation for Johnny's hit on Lorraine, "someone has to go". Tony B, knowing that Tony wants to keep his family out of New York hostilities, refuses. But he is short of money, and his young sons envy the Sopranos' standard of living. He agrees. His assigned target is Joey Peeps. Tony B finds him in his car outside a New York brothel where he has just collected a payment, and shoots him along with the girl, a prostitute, he is giving a lift to. Tony B's foot is injured when Peeps's car rolls over it, and he hobbles back to his own car.

Carmela is planning a surprise party for her father Hugh De Angelis's 75th birthday. Nudged by her mother Mary, she tells Tony that, because of the separation, it would be better if he did not attend. Tony is taken aback, but consents. Mary does not want him there because she thinks his vulgar behavior will embarrass her in front of an old friend, Russ Fegoli, who will be attending with his wife. Mary has enormous respect for Fegoli, who had a modest career in the Foreign Service. Junior tells Hugh about the party, intentionally ruining the surprise. Hugh insists that the "man of the house" attend. Carmela reluctantly invites Tony at short notice.

At the party, Mary is duly embarrassed by Tony's behavior. Tony presents Hugh with a Beretta Giubileo shotgun, but Fegoli observes that the best ones are not exported. At the end of the evening, Tony roughly puts the now-devalued shotgun in the trunk of the car. As the Fegolis are leaving, Mary apologizes to them for Tony's conduct. Carmela is furious at her mother's snobbery, commending Tony for his gift to her father and his courtesy to the guests.

As Artie leads the younger guests in a game of Marco Polo, Tony and A.J. grab Carmela and throw her into the pool. Eventually, Tony and Carmela find themselves alone. They kiss in the pool and spend the night together. He leaves in the morning before she wakes.

Deceased
 Joseph "Joey Peeps" Peparelli: shot by Tony Blundetto on Little Carmine's orders
 Heather: prostitute with Joey Peeps; shot by Tony Blundetto

Title reference
 After Hugh's birthday party, a game of Marco Polo breaks out in the Sopranos' pool.

References to previous episodes
 Sal Vitro is seen landscaping at the Sacrimoni residence per the deal that was set up in the episode "Where's Johnny?"
 Tony says to Fegoli, "A doctor in the house? That's good, because somebody usually goes down at these affairs." In "The Sopranos (The Sopranos episode)," Tony had a panic attack while barbecuing.
 Tony is wearing shorts, even though the late Carmine told him, in "For All Debts Public and Private", "A don doesn't wear shorts."

Other cultural references
 The movie Junior is watching when Bobby enters is the Fellini film, La Dolce Vita. Junior references the opening scene, in which the statue of Jesus is flown over Rome by helicopter, with the comment: "You could tell it was a dummy!"
 When Tony arrives at the house for Hugh's party, he responds to Carmela's complaints about his tardiness by reciting, "Pins and needles, needles and pins." This is a line from a ditty frequently recited by Ralph Kramden in The Honeymooners, which in turn references the nursery rhyme:  "Needles and pins, Needles and pins. When a Man marries his Trouble begins."
 Johnny Sack buys a Maserati Coupé and takes Tony for a drive.
 At Angelo's urging, Tony B does a Jackie Gleason impersonation for Rusty, who does not seem to be impressed.
 Angelo, Rusty Millio, and Tony B meet at The Four Seasons Restaurant, a subtle nod to The Four Seasons (band) of which Frankie Valli (the entertainer who plays Rusty Millio) was the lead singer.
 The sign for the Bada Bing says "Holyfield vs Lewis, Sat Nov 13." This is a reference to the rematch between heavyweight champions Evander Holyfield and Lennox Lewis, which took place on Saturday, November 13, 1999.
 The shotgun Tony gives to Hugh is a Beretta Giubileo over-under 12 gauge shotgun with hand-engraved sideplates, a straight stock, and a 28-inch barrel.

Music 
 The song on the radio in the opening scene is Mason Williams' "Classical Gas."
 The song playing on Sal Vitro's radio as he tends to Johnny Sack's garden is "Come Go With Me" by The Del-Vikings.
 One of the songs played at Hugh's birthday party is "Bandstand Boogie," best known as the original theme of American Bandstand.
 Another song played at the party is "Cherry Pink (and Apple Blossom White)" by Perez Prado.
 The song played toward the end of the party while Tony S is talking to Tony B is "Allegheny Moon" by Patti Page.
 The song being played on saxophone when the party is closing is "Stardust" by Hoagy Carmichael.
 Toward the end of the episode, as Joey Peeps is about to leave the brothel with a prostitute, Bon Jovi's "Wanted Dead or Alive" (from 1986's Slippery When Wet album) is playing in the background.
 The song playing when Tony Blundetto kills Joey Peeps, and which continues over the end credits, is "Bad 'n' Ruin" by Faces, sung by Rod Stewart, from their 1971 album Long Player (it is also played at the Bada Bing! when Tony Soprano and Tony Blundetto have their meeting).

References

External links
"Marco Polo"  at HBO

The Sopranos (season 5) episodes
2004 American television episodes
Television episodes directed by John Patterson (director)